The Mer de Glace ("Sea of Ice") is a valley glacier located on the northern slopes of the Mont Blanc massif, in the French Alps.

Geography
The glacier lies above the Chamonix valley. The pressure within the ice is known to reach at least 30 atmospheres. The former is fed by the Glacier du Talefre, whilst the latter is, in turn, fed by the Glacier des Periardes, the vast Glacier du Géant and the broad icefields of the Vallee Blanche. The Glacier du Tacul supplies much more ice than the Glacier de Leschaux.

However, if the Mer de Glace is considered in its broadest sense (i.e. from source to tongue), it is a compound valley glacier, gaining ice from snowfields that cover the heights directly north of Mont Blanc at an altitude of around 4,000 metres. It flows for a total distance of 12 kilometres, covering an area of 32 square kilometres in the central third of the Mont Blanc massif.

From the Aiguille du Tacul, the Mer de Glace flows north-north-west between Aiguille du Moine on the east and Trélaporte on the west. The glacier was once easily visible from Chamonix but has been shrinking backwards, and is now barely visible from below. The surface topography of the Mer de Glace changed very little during the first third of the 20th century, but from 1939 to 2001 the surface of the glacier has lowered an average of 30 cm each year, corresponding to an equivalent loss of 700 million cubic metres of water.

 
When the tension in the ice increases as the slope increases, the glacier is unable to deform and crevasses appear. These are notably transversal and, when there is intense crevasse activity on the steepest terrain, blocks of seracs appear as the glacier breaks up. Crevasses are of variable depth, depending on their position, and may be as deep as fifty metres. Seracs always form in the same places, namely the steepest sections over which the glacier flows. As crevasses open and seracs tumble downstream, the supply of ice is renewed by the constant flow from upstream. Broad banding patterns, visible on the surface of the Mer de Glace, are known as ogives, or Forbes bands, and result from differences in summer and winter collapse rates of the serac fields. It was on 24 July 1842 that Scottish physicist James David Forbes observed the pattern of light and dark dirt bands on the Mer de Glace from the nearby Charmoz and began to consider whether glaciers flowed in a similar fashion to a sluggish river and with a viscous or plastic manner.

In the 18th and 19th centuries the glacier descended all the way down to the hamlet of Les Bois, where it was known as Glacier des Bois. At that time the river Arveyron emerged from the glacier under a grotto-like vault (grotte d'Arveyron) and, through the accounts of early writers and explorers, attracted many more visitors,  painters and later photographers, for example Joseph Mallord William Turner's "Source of the Arveron in the Valley of Chamouni Savoy", 1816. The position of its front end fluctuated over the years but its maximum extent was in the mid-19th century.

Literary/Cultural References
Mary Shelley's Frankenstein, The Modern Prometheus, references Mer de Glace during Victor Frankenstein's hikes into the Mount Blanc massif. Dr. Frankenstein meets his creation twice during mountaineering on the Mer de Glace.

See also

 Arveyron
 Électricité de France
 List of glaciers

Notes

References

 NEW EDITION (reprinted as )

External links 

Mer de Glace and associated glaciers on French IGN mapping portal
360° photo from surface of Mer de Glace on Google StreetView

Glaciers of Metropolitan France
Landforms of Haute-Savoie
Tourism in Auvergne-Rhône-Alpes
Glaciers of the Alps
Landforms of Auvergne-Rhône-Alpes